Dwayne Keith Dixon (born August 2, 1962) is an American former college and professional football player who was a wide receiver in the National Football League (NFL) and Arena Football League (AFL). He played college football for the University of Florida, and thereafter, played professionally for the Tampa Bay Buccaneers of the NFL, and the Washington Commandos and Detroit Drive of the Arena Football League. Dixon has been a college football coach since 1990.

Early life 

Dixon was born in Gainesville, Florida in 1962.  He attended Santa Fe High School in Alachua, Florida, where he was a standout prep football player for the Santa Fe Raiders high school football team.

College career 

Dixon accepted an athletic scholarship to attend the University of Florida in nearby Gainesville, where he was a wide receiver for coach Charley Pell's Florida Gators football team from 1980 to 1983.  Dixon led the Gators with 589 receiving yards as junior in 1982, and again with 596 yards as a senior in 1983.  As a senior, he was also a first-team All-Southeastern Conference (SEC) selection, an Associated Press honorable mention All-American, and the recipient of the Gators' Fergie Ferguson Award, recognizing the senior who displayed "outstanding leadership, character and courage."

Dixon graduated from Florida with a bachelor's degree in criminal justice in 1985, and he was inducted into the University of Florida Athletic Hall of Fame as a "Gator Great" in 1997.

Professional career 

Dixon was signed by the Tampa Bay Buccaneers as an undrafted free agent in 1984, but he saw little action with the Buccaneers during the  season.

Coaching career 

In 1990, Dixon returned to his alma mater to become the wide receivers coach for the Florida Gators under head coach Steve Spurrier, a position that he continued to hold under Spurrier's successor, Ron Zook.  During his fifteen years as a Florida assistant, the Gators won six SEC championships (1991, 1993, 1994, 1995, 1996, 2000) and one national championship (1996).  He was a 2001 finalist for the Broyles Award, given annually to the nation's top college football assistant coach. Dixon held the same position for the North Carolina State Wolfpack from 2005 to 2006, and he is currently the wide receivers coach for the Ohio University Bobcats.

Personal life

Dixon is married and has two children.

See also 

 Florida Gators
 Florida Gators football, 1980–89
 Florida Gators football, 1990–99
 History of the Tampa Bay Buccaneers
 List of University of Florida alumni
 List of University of Florida Athletic Hall of Fame members
 Ohio Bobcats

References

Bibliography 

 Carlson, Norm, University of Florida Football Vault: The History of the Florida Gators, Whitman Publishing, LLC, Atlanta, Georgia (2007).  .
 Golenbock, Peter, Go Gators!  An Oral History of Florida's Pursuit of Gridiron Glory, Legends Publishing, LLC, St. Petersburg, Florida (2002).  .
 Hairston, Jack, Tales from the Gator Swamp: A Collection of the Greatest Gator Stories Ever Told, Sports Publishing, LLC, Champaign, Illinois (2002).  .
 McCarthy, Kevin M.,  Fightin' Gators: A History of University of Florida Football, Arcadia Publishing, Mount Pleasant, South Carolina (2000).  .
 Nash, Noel, ed., The Gainesville Sun Presents The Greatest Moments in Florida Gators Football, Sports Publishing, Inc., Champaign, Illinois (1998).  .

1962 births
Living people
American football linebackers
American football wide receivers
Detroit Drive players
Florida Gators football coaches
Florida Gators football players
NC State Wolfpack football coaches
Ohio Bobcats football coaches
Players of American football from Gainesville, Florida
Tampa Bay Buccaneers players
Washington Commandos players
National Football League replacement players